= Danish pile-driving formula =

Formula for the bearing capacity of a driven pile

The Danish pile-driving formula is a formula which enables one to have a good gauge of the bearing capacity of a driven pile.

== History ==
The formula was constructed by the Danish civil engineer Andreas Knudsen in 1955. It was made as a part of his final project at The Technical University of Denmark and was published for the Geotechnic Congress in London in 1956. It later became part of the Danish Code of Practice for Foundation Engineering and was named.

== The formula ==
$Q_{dy} = \frac{\alpha W_H H}{S + 0.5S_e}$

in which

$S_e = \sqrt{\frac{2 \alpha W_H HL}{AE}}$

where

- Q_{dy} = ultimate dynamic bearing capacity of driven pile
- α = pile driving hammer efficiency
- W_{H} = weight of hammer
- H = hammer drop
- S = inelastic set of piles, in distance pr. hammer blow
- S_{e} = elastic set of piles, in distance pr. hammer blow
- L = pile length
- A = pile end area
- E = modulus of elasticity of pile material
